Hyppa contrasta, known generally as the summer hyppa moth or Russian mustard moth, is a species of cutworm or dart moth in the family Noctuidae. It is found in North America.

The MONA or Hodges number for Hyppa contrasta is 9579.

References

Further reading

 
 
 

Xylenini
Articles created by Qbugbot
Moths described in 1946